Wang Ning (born April 1961) is a Chinese politician currently serving as party secretary of Yunnan. He is an alternate member and then a member of the 19th Central Committee of the Chinese Communist Party.

Biography
Wang was born in Shenyang, Liaoning, in April 1961. He graduated from Liaoning Architectural Engineering Institute (now Shenyang Jianzhu University). 

He joined the Chinese Communist Party in June 1983. He served in the Ministry of Construction and then Ministry of Housing and Urban-Rural Development, where he was promoted to become its vice-minister in July 2013.

In December 2015 he was transferred to southeast China's Fujian province and appointed head of the Organization Department of the Fujian Provincial Committee of the Chinese Communist Party. In June 2017, he was appointed mayor of Fuzhou and secretary of the Party Working Committee of Fuzhou New Development Zone. He became Deputy Party Secretary of Fujian in May 2018. On July 2, 2020, he was named acting governor of Fujian, replacing Tang Dengjie. On September 15, he was installed as governor of Fujian.

On 19 October 2021, he was transferred to southwest China's Yunnan province and appointed party secretary, the top political position in the province.

In October 2022, he became a member of the 19th Central Committee of the Chinese Communist Party.

References

1961 births
Living people
Politicians from Shenyang
People's Republic of China politicians from Liaoning
Chinese Communist Party politicians from Liaoning
Members of the 19th Central Committee of the Chinese Communist Party
Alternate members of the 19th Central Committee of the Chinese Communist Party
Governors of Fujian